Mysterious Galaxy is an independent bookstore located in San Diego, California. It was founded in 1993 and caters mostly to fans of genre fiction such as mystery, fantasy, science fiction, and horror. It is noted for hosting book signings and readings by numerous authors of the genres.

History
On May 8, 1993 Terry Gilman, Maryelizabeth Hart, and Jeff Mariotte hosted the grand opening of Mysterious Galaxy with prominent authors such as Ray Bradbury, David Brin, and Robert Crais in attendance as well as many fans of genre fiction. With the tagline "Books of Martians, Murder, Magic and Mayhem" Mysterious Galaxy has filled the niche of San Diego's most prominent genre bookstore.

Mysterious Galaxy opened a second location in Redondo Beach in mid-2011, which closed in 2014.

In 2019, Mysterious Galaxy sought a new owner and new location and was subsequently purchased by Matthew Berger and Jenni Marchisotto.

References

Further reading

External links

 

Buildings and structures in San Diego
Bookstores in California
1993 establishments in California
American companies established in 1993
Retail companies established in 1993
Independent bookstores of the United States